Ivan Cvetković (born 12 February 1981) is a Serbian former professional footballer who played as midfielder.

Club career
While playing for Zvezdara, Cvetković made his First League of FR Yugoslavia debuts in the 2001–02 campaign, the club's first season in the nation's top flight. He subsequently moved to OFK Beograd in the summer of 2002. During his first season with the Romantičari, Cvetković was a first-team regular, making 30 league appearances and scoring two goals.

In the 2005 winter transfer window, Cvetković switched to Javor Ivanjica. He was a regular member of the team that won the 2007–08 Serbian First League with an unbeaten record. In early 2009, Cvetković moved abroad for the first time and joined Russian side Khimki. He scored two goals in 21 games during the 2009 Russian Premier League, as the club suffered relegation.

After a short spell at Javor Ivanjica, Cvetković moved abroad again and signed with Kazakhstan Premier League club Zhetysu in the summer of 2010. He amassed 56 league appearances and scored three goals over the next two years. In August 2012, Cvetković returned to Serbia and joined Jagodina. He helped the club win the Serbian Cup in 2013, their first major trophy ever, and reach the final the very next year. In early 2015, Cvetković made a return to Kazakhstan and his former club Zhetysu. He also played for Okzhetpes in the second half of the year. In early 2016, Cvetković returned to Jagodina.

In the summer of 2016, Cvetković rejoined Javor Ivanjica. In June 2020, Cvetković finished his playing career, after Serbian SuperLiga game between Inđija and Javor.

International career
At international level, Cvetković made one appearance for FR Yugoslavia U21, playing the first half of a 1–2 friendly loss away against Spain U21 in April 2002.

Honours
Javor Ivanjica
 Serbian First League: 2007–08
Jagodina
 Serbian Cup: 2012–13; Runner-up 2013–14

References

External links
 
 
 

Association football midfielders
Expatriate footballers in Kazakhstan
Expatriate footballers in Russia
FC Khimki players
FC Okzhetpes players
FC Zhetysu players
First League of Serbia and Montenegro players
FK Jagodina players
FK Javor Ivanjica players
FK Zvezdara players
Kazakhstan Premier League players
OFK Beograd players
Sportspeople from Prizren
Russian Premier League players
Serbia and Montenegro footballers
Serbia and Montenegro under-21 international footballers
Serbian expatriate footballers
Serbian expatriate sportspeople in Kazakhstan
Serbian expatriate sportspeople in Russia
Serbian First League players
Serbian footballers
Serbian SuperLiga players
Kosovo Serbs
1981 births
Living people